Robin Murdoch (31 July 1911 – 13 September 1994) was a Scottish athlete who competed in the 1934 British Empire Games.

At the 1934 Empire Games he was a member of the Scottish relay team which won the bronze medal in the 4×110 yards event. In the 220 yards competition he finished fourth and in the 100 yards contest he finished fifth.

External links
Profile at TOPS in athletics
Robin Murdoch's obituary

1911 births
1994 deaths
Scottish male sprinters
Athletes (track and field) at the 1934 British Empire Games
Commonwealth Games bronze medallists for Scotland
Commonwealth Games medallists in athletics
Medallists at the 1934 British Empire Games